Félix Bouvet (born 16 June 1991) is a French male canoeist who won two medals at senior level at the Wildwater Canoeing World Championships.

He  won two editions of the Wildwater Canoeing World Cup in K1.

Medals at the World Championships
Senior

References

External links
 

1991 births
Living people
French male canoeists
Place of birth missing (living people)